Purna is one of the major rivers in the Indian state of Gujarat. The river has its origins in Saputara Hill ranges in the Dang district of Gujarat. Purna river has a drainage area of 2431 km2 and it travels 180 km before joining with Arabian sea. Zankhri river is main tributary of Purna river. Purna Wildlife Sanctuary was declared a sanctuary in July 1990, derives its name from the Purna River, which flows through the sanctuary.

Navsari city is located in southern Gujarat and is situated on the bank of the Purna River, within a few kilometres of the river's delta, which is west of the city and empties into the Gulf of Khambhat.

See also
 Forest of the Dangs

References

Rivers of Gujarat
Rivers of Maharashtra
Rivers of India